Recapture is a 1930 drama in three acts by Preston Sturges, his third play to appear on Broadway.

The Broadway production was directed by Don Mullally and produced by A. H. Woods. It opened on January 29, 1930, at the Eltinge 42nd Street Theatre, and ran for 24 performances, closing in February of that year.  According to Sturges, the play received "the most violently destructive notices [he] had seen in years."

Appearing in the cast were Melvyn Douglas and Glenda Farrell.

References

External links
 
 

Plays by Preston Sturges
1930 plays